Hot zone, also written as hot-zone or hotzone, refers to an area that is considered to be dangerous. It generally entails special equipment to protect occupants, because there is a high risk of infection.

Etymology 
The term hot zone was likely coined during the Cold War where it described locations rendered hazardous due to nuclear contamination. The term was later extended to areas or locations considered to be hazardous such as Level-4 biosafety labs, places in which there is active conflict, and so forth.

The term hot zone was popularized by the 1995 book The Hot Zone by Richard Preston, and its film adaptation Outbreak, released the same year.

Types of hot zones

Biological

Hazardous biological agents can induce a hot zone, as occupants are in danger of becoming infected. These biological contaminants can include many things. Some common examples would be bacteria, viruses, and fungi. Many times these are used as biological warfare, or biowarfare, agents with the intent to harm.

Precautions are taken in a gradient level of protection.

In 2009, the outbreak of swine influenza happened in most places of the whole world. The swine influenza originated from a Mexican woman, and it was transmitted from person to person by air with a rapid speed. North America and Mexico were the first places to be affected by the virus.  According to the World Health Organization (WHO), there were 14,142 deaths of swine influenza, and 1,311,522 people had this virus in their bodies in 2009. Spain, China, the United States, and South Korea are considered to be hot zones of swine influenza. There were 155,051 people who had this virus in Spain, 120,498 in China, 107,939 in United States and 101,182 in South Korea.  The people in those areas can very easily get this virus. The virus is transmittable through the air, such as through coughing, sneezing or touching something containing the virus. Epidemics of acute respiratory disease of pigs are caused by the virus disease, swine influenza. Swine influenza belongs to the type A of the family Orthomyxoviridae. The patients with swine influenza virus have symptoms consisting of headaches, chills, fatigue, fever, cough and sore throat.

Malaria 
In Peru deforestation is leading to the distribution of Malaria. With the forests being destroyed the wildlife is as well, leaving malaria looking for a new host. Malaria is a very dangerous disease, so much so that vaccinations are required for traveling into places suspected of housing the disease. Malaria is a disease that is found predominantly in third world, low-income countries. Malaria along with other insect diseases are learning to adapt to life in the city. In Peru a port city called Iquitos the population has been growing in the past 10 years making it prime for mosquitoes to flourish. These mosquitoes also bring in Dengue Fever, in which 5 percent of its victims will die.

Clean water 
With an increased world population in the early 21st century water borne diseases have become the most pressing hot zone. With a lot of the worlds population moving into the city it is hard separating sanitation and clean water. In the early 1990s a cholera epidemic broke out in a fishing village in Lima, Peru. Many thought that this was coming from the seafood, but it was really from the water the seafood was cleaned with. Cholera starts when infected human waste seeps into the water supply of a community. Not having a clean water supply is something that affects a third world country the most, though there are cases of poor water in the States. In Maryland's Chesapeake Bay fisherman have seen a decline in their catch over the last couple of years. A few years ago fisherman of Maryland's Chesapeake Bay area started noticing lesions on the crabs and fish they caught and soon the fisherman were sick themselves. Industrial waste, sewage and pesticides have slowly sunk into the Chesapeake Bay over the past decade.

Chemical
Hazardous chemicals can induce a hot zone, as occupants are in danger of it disrupting their biological processes. For example, if while driving down a highway, an oil tanker gets into a car accident and spills its load on the pavement and surrounding grass areas, those areas affected will be considered hot zones. To correct these incidents, fire departments will deploy their HAZMAT, or hazardous materials, teams to reder the area safe once again. These types of spills can be harmful to people and to the environment because they are not meant to be there and therefore contaminate the land.

Nuclear
Radioactive contamination can create a hot zone, as occupants are in danger of being exposed to radiation.

In March 2011, a 9.0-magnitude earthquake and its accompanying tsunami struck a nuclear power station in Fukushima Daiichi area of northeastern Japan. A number of safety systems were badly damaged by the tsunami leading to a loss-of-coolant (LOCA) event which damaged the nuclear core of several reactors.  The Nuclear and Industrial Safety Agency (NISA) announced that the subsequent release of radioactivity into atmosphere qualified as the highest level of radiological event scale, INES level 7. The radioactive materials released in Fukushima Daiichi area are mostly iodine-131 and cesium-137.

The Nuclear and Industrial Safety Agency estimated the cancer consequence of the Fukushima Daiichi accident. From the government statistics, around the two million people who live within 80 kilometre radius of the nuclear plate, and about one million people live in areas contaminated with cesium-137.

Land contamination 
The loss of coolant further caused hydrogen explosions in the facility. As the fuel temperature went up, zirconium alloy cladding reacted with the hot steam removing oxygen from water molecule, leaving hydrogen gas. The hydrogen gas was ultimately vented off into the reactor building, because of the design of the facility, mixing with air and creating an explosive environment.

Disease 
Diseases are estimated that thyroid cancer is the main cancer which affected by the nuclear accident. High amount of radioactive iodine mainly causes thyroid cancer, and most of the cases are the result of releasing iodine-131. If people consume food and water contaminated by iodine-131, iodine-131 (which has a half-life of eight days) concentrates in the thyroid. The most contaminated food and drink are raw milk and vegetables in Fukushima Daiichi area. Milk production was blocked after six days of the nuclear explosion.

Nuclear accidents are very serious matters. As you can see from the above statements, they can cause massive panic, disease, and not to mention the fact that humans and other organisms may not be able to inhabit the affected area for many years to come. A perfect example of this is the nuclear accident in Chernobyl, Ukraine. Chernobyl is near Pripyat, Ukraine and also the country of Belarus. Chernobyl is now a ghost town. They had a malfunction with their nuclear power plant, and now there is still a hot zone there. This hot zone actually has a name, the Chernobyl Exclusion Zone.

Violence
Violence can induce a hot zone, as occupants are subject to attacks, crossfire, or even direct fire targeted at them specifically. The most identifiable violent hot zones are in war zones, such as the war in Afghanistan. Soldiers are constantly fighting with other soldiers and insurgents to attempt to accomplish tactical goals. Hot zones are not good places to appear as a member of either of the opposing teams, because one may be prone to attacks or capture. Although war zones may have the most targeted attacks, crime ridden neighborhoods are the most common areas for crossfire to occur, and subsequently the most victims of crossfire are here.

See also 
 Zone of alienation

References

Further reading 
 

Biological hazards